Ryan Shaw (born 26 September 1992) is an English professional rugby league footballer who plays  or  for the Barrow Raiders in Betfred Championship.

Shaw is a product of the Warrington Wolves academy, spending time on loan from Warrington at the Castleford Tigers and the London Broncos in the Super League, the Leigh Centurions and the Swinton Lions in the Co-operative Championship, Barrow in the Championship 1 and the Co-operative Championship. He played for the Bradford Bulls in the Kingstone Press Championship, before signing for Hull Kingston Rovers in the top flight of English rugby league. He has also played for Leigh on a permanent basis in the Betfred Championship.

Background
Shaw was born in Barrow-in-Furness, Cumbria, England.

Career
Shaw started his career in the academy at Warrington. He had spells at Leigh and Barrow on dual-registration deals, but failed to make a first team appearance for Warrington. He was signed by Swinton for the 2013 season. He joined London Broncos on loan later that year, where he made his Super League début. He spent the 2014 season with hometown club, Barrow and rugby idol Mike Backhouse

Bradford Bulls
2015 - 2015 Season

Shaw signed for Bradford on a one-year deal. He featured in the pre-season friendlies against Castleford Tigers and Leeds. He scored against Castleford Tigers (1 try) and Leeds (1 try).

He featured in Round 2 (Whitehaven) to Round 23 (Halifax) then in Qualifier 7 (Halifax). He also featured in the Challenge Cup in Round 4 (Workington Town) to Round 5 (Hull Kingston Rovers). He scored against Featherstone Rovers (9 goals), Hunslet (4 tries, 16 goals), Batley (1 try, 8 goals), Workington Town (2 tries, 20 goals), Halifax (4 tries, 13 goals), Dewsbury Rams (1 try, 6 goals), London Broncos (1 try, 10 goals), Hull Kingston Rovers (5 goals), Doncaster (2 tries, 9 goals), Whitehaven (4 goals), Sheffield Eagles (1 try, 5 goals) and Leigh Centurions (6 goals).

Hull KR
Shaw left Bradford at the end of the 2015 season for Hull Kingston Rovers on the recommendation of former Great Britain prop Jamie Peacock.

Leeds Tykes
On 11 October 2019, it was reported that he had switched codes to rugby union and signed for Leeds Tykes in the RFU Championship

Leigh Centurions
On 16 February 2020 it was reported that he had returned to rugby league and signed for Leigh in the RFL Championship

Barrow Raiders
On 25 December 2020, it was reported that he had signed a two-year deal with Barrow in the RFL League 1

Statistics
Statistics do not include pre-season friendlies.

References

External links

Hull Kingston Rovers profile
 (archived by web.archive.org) Hull KR profile
Bradford Bulls profile
SL profile

1992 births
Living people
Barrow Raiders players
Bradford Bulls players
Castleford Tigers players
English rugby league players
Hull Kingston Rovers players
Leeds Tykes players
Leigh Leopards players
London Broncos players
Rugby league centres
Rugby league fullbacks
Rugby league players from Barrow-in-Furness
Swinton Lions players
Warrington Wolves players